A Meath County Council election was held in County Meath in Ireland on 24 May 2019 as part of that year's local elections. All 40 councillors were elected for a five-year term of office from 6 local electoral areas (LEAs) by single transferable vote.

The 2018 LEA boundary review committee kept the LEAs used in the 2014 elections, with some boundary adjustments necessitated by population shifts revealed by the 2016 census. The changes were enacted by statutory instrument (S.I.) 628/2018, which was later amended by S.I. No. 8/2019.

Fine Gael lost 1 seat but remained the largest party with 12 seats overall but with an increased vote share. Fianna Fáil gained 2 seats overall to return with 12 seats also but their vote share reduced compared to 2014. Sinn Féin had a very poor election losing 5 seats overall and being reduced to having representation solely in Ashbourne, Kells and Navan. One of the Sinn Féin losses in Navan was to Emer Tóibín, a sister of Peadar Tóibín TD. Through Annie Hoey, Labour regained a seat on the Council in Laytown-Bettystown and in Trim Ronan Moore won a seat for the Social Democrats. The number Independent councillors increased from 9 to 10.

Sharon Keogan secured election in both the Ashbourne LEA and the Laytown-Bettystown LEA, becoming the first woman in Ireland elected to two electoral areas.  She initially objected to being required to choose one of two seats, but later chose Laytown-Bettystown. The Ashbourne seat was filled by a controversial co-option.

Results by party

Results by local electoral area

Ashbourne

Kells

Laytown–Bettystown

Navan

Ratoath

Trim

Results by gender

Changes Since 2019
† Ashbourne Independent Cllr Sharon Keogan resigned her seat after the local elections as she had been elected for 2 LEAs. Amanda Smith was co-opted to fill the vacancy on 1 July 2019.
†† Ashbourne Sinn Féin Cllr Darren O'Rourke was elected as a Teachta Dála (TD) for Meath East at the 2020 general election. Aisling O'Neill was co-opted to fill the vacancy on 24 February 2020.
††† Kells Sinn Féin Cllr Johnny Guirke was elected as a TD for Meath West at the 2020 general election. Former Cllr Michael Gallagher was co-opted to fill the vacancy.
†††† Laytown-Bettystown Labour Cllr Annie Hoey was elected as a Senator in March 2020, on the Agricultural Panel. Elaine McGinty was co-opted to fill the vacancy on 8 June 2020.
††††† Laytown-Bettystown Independent Cllr Sharon Keogan was elected as a Senator in April 2020, on the Industrial and Commercial Panel. Her sister, Geraldine Keogan, was co-opted to fill the vacancy on 8 June 2020.

Footnotes

References

Sources
 
 
 

2019 Irish local elections
2019